Cam McDaniel (born September 20, 1991) is a former gridiron football running back.

Early life
McDaniel attended Coppell High School in Coppell, Texas. In 2009, McDaniel rushed for over 1,200 yards and 20 touchdowns, while also catching 57 passes for seven touchdowns. The next season, McDaniel ran for 1,906 yards and 32 touchdowns while recording 40 receptions for 492 yards and three touchdowns. He was eventually named second-team all-state running back by the Texas Associated Press Sports Editors Class 5A team, and The Dallas Morning News named him to the all-area team's second team. The Fort Worth Star-Telegram awarded him MVP of District 7-5A. With McDaniel, the Coppell Cowboys lost only total three games, and went undefeated in his senior year.

College career
During his junior year of high school, McDaniel was offered scholarships by eight schools: Iowa, Iowa State, Colorado, Tulsa, Stanford, Texas Tech, Minnesota and Navy. In 2010, McDaniel was offered additional scholarships by Air Force, Cincinnati, Army and Louisiana Tech. On November 30, McDaniel announced his commitment to Notre Dame.

Notre Dame
ESPN stated that McDaniel was expected to serve as a slot receiver. In his freshman year, McDaniel served as a backup running back and on special teams, recording nine yards on three rushing attempts, while returning two kickoffs for 24 yards. In 2012, McDaniel played both running back and cornerback, while also playing special teams. He scored his first touchdown on October 6 against Miami (FL); McDaniel also set a school record for most consecutive carries on a drive with nine. McDaniel ended the 2012 season with 125 yards rushing and a touchdown.

On October 19, 2013 against the USC Trojans, McDaniel ran for a career-high 92 yards. That same game, he lost his helmet during a run, and a photo taken of him with tousled hair and a "Zoolander-esque smirk" went viral as "Ridiculously Photogenic Football Player", creating an Internet meme. McDaniel ended the 2013 season with 705 rushing yards and three touchdowns.

In his senior year, McDaniel was named a team captain. He concluded the 2014 season with 278 rushing yards and four touchdowns.

College statistics

Professional career

2015 NFL Draft

McDaniel was not invited to the NFL Scouting Combine, though he attended Notre Dame's Pro Day on March 31, 2015, one of eleven players to do so. McDaniel recorded a three-cone drill time of 6.78 seconds, faster than all running backs invited to the Combine, and would rank fifth among running backs in the last five Combines.

McDaniel was not drafted by any team in the 2015 NFL Draft, but was offered a tryout with the Dallas Cowboys.

Canadian Football League
McDaniel first latched on with the Montreal Alouettes of the Canadian Football League for whom he played one game with in 2016. On May 11, 2017, McDaniel signed with the Toronto Argonauts, and was active for 9 games. While McDaniel did not play, he was a part of the Argos team that won the 105th Grey Cup. Overall in his professional career, McDaniel played in 10 games, recording 8 rushes for 26 yards, in addition to catching 3 passes for 44 yards.

Personal life
McDaniel married high school sweetheart Stephani Sterrett on May 17, 2014. McDaniel's father, Danny McDaniel, is the head football coach at Prosper High School, and with his wife Diane, are producers for AdvoCare. McDaniel's grandfather and great-grandfather were also head coaches at Prosper. He has two brothers, Gavin and TJ both of whom also play running back; Gavin was a member of the Washington Huskies and Azusa Pacific Cougars, while TJ plays for the SMU Mustangs.

References

External links
 Rivals bio
 Notre Dame bio

Living people
1991 births
American football running backs
Canadian football running backs
American players of Canadian football
Notre Dame Fighting Irish football players
Montreal Alouettes players
Players of American football from Texas
People from Coppell, Texas
Toronto Argonauts players